Richard Hewlett may refer to:

 Richard G. Hewlett (1923–2015), American historian
 Richard Hewlett (American Revolutionary War) (1729–1789), Royalist soldier